The Flam is an album by American jazz saxophonist Frank Lowe recorded in 1975 for the Italian Black Saint label.

Reception
The Allmusic review by Scott Yanow awarded the album 4½ stars stating "The very explorative and rather emotional music holds one's interest throughout. These often heated performances are better heard than described".

Track listing
 "Sun Voyage" (Joseph Bowie) - 7:35 
 "Flam" (Frank Lowe) - 14:03 
 "Be-Bo-Bo-Be" (Chales Bobo Shaw) - 10:53 
 "Third St. Stomp" (Alex Blake, Joseph Bowie, Frank Lowe, Charles Bobo Shaw, Leo Smith) - 10:21 
 "U.B.O." (Leo Smith) - 0:45

Personnel
Frank Lowe - tenor saxophone
Leo Smith - trumpet, flugelhorn, wood flute
Joseph Bowie - trombone
Alex Blake - bass, electric bass
Charles "Bobo" Shaw - drums

References

Black Saint/Soul Note albums
Frank Lowe albums
1975 albums